Pål Gunnar Mikkelsplass (born 29 April 1961) is a former Norwegian cross-country skier who competed from 1981 to 1997. He won the 15 km silver at the 1988 Winter Olympics in Calgary.

Mikkelsplass also won the 15 km event at the Holmenkollen ski festival in 1981. His best-known successes were at the FIS Nordic World Ski Championships where he won two golds (4 × 10 km relay: 1982, 1985), one silver (15 km: 1989), and one bronze (4 × 10 km relay: 1987).

He married fellow skier Marit Wold in 1994.

Cross-country skiing results
All results are sourced from the International Ski Federation (FIS).

Olympic Games
 1 medal – (1 silver)

World Championships
 4 medals – (2 gold, 1 silver, 1 bronze)

World Cup

Season standings

Individual podiums
 4 victories 
 20 podiums

Team podiums
 3 victories 
 11 podiums 

Note:   Until the 1999 World Championships and the 1994 Olympics, World Championship and Olympic races were included in the World Cup scoring system.

References

External links
 
 Holmenkollen winners since 1892 - click Vinnere for downloadable pdf file 

1961 births
Living people
People from Nes, Buskerud
Cross-country skiers at the 1984 Winter Olympics
Cross-country skiers at the 1988 Winter Olympics
Holmenkollen Ski Festival winners
Norwegian male cross-country skiers
Olympic cross-country skiers of Norway
Olympic silver medalists for Norway
Olympic medalists in cross-country skiing
FIS Nordic World Ski Championships medalists in cross-country skiing
Medalists at the 1988 Winter Olympics
Sportspeople from Viken (county)